The Grant Fire was a wildfire that burned east of the city of Sacramento near the rural community of Sloughhouse in Sacramento County, California in the United States. There were no reports of injuries and only one structure was damaged in the fire, however during the fires peak there were mandatory evacuations ordered near and around Glory Lane and Prairie City OHV Park.

Events
Reportedly sparking along Grant Line Road and Kiefer Blvd at around 1:00 pm on Friday, June 12, the fire was immediately described as burning at a rapid rate of spread with already 150 acres in size as it burned in grasses and other light vegetation as its growth was fanned by heavy wind. Within several hours the fire would jump firebreaks and expand to 700 acres to then 2,000 acres as multiple agencies from in and around Sacramento County aided in containment. The fireline had also damaged one structure. By 6:00 pm that evening, the fire had ballooned to  but fire activity had largely subsided due to the burn area being predominantly light flashy fuels, as the fire was 30% contained. Although the fire continued to remain inactive and the acreage would not grow any further, full containment would not be reached until June 17, 2020.

See also
2020 California wildfires

References

Wildfires in Sacramento County, California
2020 California wildfires